St. John's Church in the north German town of Plön was built in 1685 as an independent parish church when Plön's new town, Neustadt, was developed by Duke John Adolphus.

The timber-framed hall church (Saalkirche), with its three-sided polygonal end, was altered in 1861 by the installation of new windows. Further changes were made in 1910, when the interior was changed to the style of Gothic Revival.

External links 
 for the preservation of St. John's Church (Förderverein Johanniskirche Plön)
 Insights of Plön: Historic pictures and old postcards

Plön
Buildings and structures in Plön (district)
Lutheran churches in Schleswig-Holstein